Crossing Border Festival is an annual festival in The Hague, Netherlands focusing on new pop music acts and literature. It is one of the largest combined music and literature festivals in Europe. The first edition took place in 1993, as a larger follow-on to the Zuiderstrand Festival held in 1991 and 1992. The festival originated in The Hague; was shifted to Amsterdam, but afterwards shifted back to The Hague.  The city government is involved with the fest as part of their support of the arts.

The 2016 festival is scheduled for 2-6 November in The Hague.

Border Sessions

Starting in 2013, the festival added an affiliated international technology festival, "Border Sessions," bringing in speakers, interviewing technologists and science fiction writers, and setting up meet-up events and workshops.  In 2014 the "Border Sessions" technology festival ran on 12-13 November 2014, immediately preceding the main festival.  The 2015 session is scheduled for 11-12 November 2015.

References

External links
 www.crossingborder.nl

Music festivals in the Netherlands
Book fairs in the Netherlands
1993 establishments in the Netherlands
Annual events in the Netherlands
Music festivals established in 1993
Culture in The Hague
Music in The Hague
Autumn events in the Netherlands